Shuhrat Mamajonov (born 16 March 1970) is a retired Tajikistani footballer. In 2003, he works as an assistant in FC Nasaf Qarshi.

Career
Born in Dushanbe, Mamajonov played football for clubs in Tajikistan and Uzbekistan. He made 27 appearances for FC Pamir Dushanbe in the Soviet Top League.

References

External links
 
 Profile at klisf.info

1970 births
Living people
Association football defenders
Soviet footballers
Tajikistani footballers
Tajikistani expatriate footballers
FC Chornomorets Odesa players
Navbahor Namangan players
CSKA Pamir Dushanbe players
Expatriate footballers in Ukraine
Expatriate footballers in Uzbekistan
Tajikistani expatriate sportspeople in Uzbekistan
Tajikistan international footballers
Soviet Top League players